Kalateh-ye Now (also Romanized as Kalāteh-ye Now, Kalāteh-i-Nau, and Kalateh Now; also known as Kalāt-e Now) is a village in Darmian Rural District, in the Central District of Darmian County, South Khorasan Province, Iran. At the 2006 census, its population was 12, in 4 families.

References 

Populated places in Darmian County